Oppenweiler is a town in the Rems-Murr district in Baden-Württemberg, Germany.

History
Oppenweiler merged with Reichenberg on 1 April 1938.

Geography
The municipality (Gemeinde) of Oppenweiler is located in the Rems-Murr district of Baden-Württemberg, one of the 16 States of the Federal Republic of Germany. Elevation above sea level in the municipal area ranges from a high of  Normalnull (NN) to a low of  NN.

Politics
Oppenweiler has one borough (Ortsteil), Oppenweiler, and 12 villages: Aichelbach, Bernhalden, Ellenweiler, Reichenbach, Reichenberg, Reutenhof, Rohrbach, Rüflensmühle, Schiffrain, Unterstaigacker, Wilhelmsheim, and Zell. Also in the municipal area is the industrial district of Wachthäusle and the abandoned villages of Charlottenhof and Giselmar.

Coat of arms
Oppenweiler's coat of arms shows a field of yellow crossed by a red bend dexter that houses three yellow ax heads. This coat of arms was awarded to Oppenweiler with a municipal flag by the government of Baden-Württemberg on 14 November 1955.

Transportation
Oppenweiler is connected to Germany's network of roadways by the Bundesstraße 14 and to its rail network by the Waiblingen–Schwäbisch Hall railway. Local public transportation is provided by the Verkehrs- und Tarifverbund Stuttgart.

References

External links

  (in German)

Rems-Murr-Kreis
Württemberg